Podbranč is a village and municipality in Senica District in the Trnava Region of western Slovakia.

History
In historical records the village was first mentioned in 1297.

Geography
The municipality lies at an altitude of 420 metres and covers an area of 14.137 km2. It has a population of about 645 people.

References

External links

 Official page

Villages and municipalities in Senica District